Gugum Gumilar (born on August 15, 1994) is an Indonesian footballer who currently plays for Semen Padang in the Indonesia Super League.

References

External links

1994 births
Association football forwards
Association football midfielders
Living people
Indonesian footballers
Liga 1 (Indonesia) players
Pelita Bandung Raya players